Link is a rock outcrop on the surface of Aeolis Palus, between Peace Vallis and Aeolis Mons ("Mount Sharp"), in Gale crater on the planet Mars. The outcrop was encountered by the Curiosity rover on the way from Bradbury Landing to Glenelg Intrigue on September 2, 2012 (the 27th sol of the mission), and was named after a significant rock formation (and lake) in the Northwest Territories of Canada. The "approximate" site coordinates are: .

The outcrop is a well-sorted gravel conglomerate, containing well-rounded, smooth, abraded pebbles. Pebbles and gravel a few millimeters to centimeters across are embedded in amongst a finer, white matrix. This outcrop geology is strikingly similar to some terrestrial fluvial conglomerates. Around the rock are scattered well sorted loose gravel around 1 cm across, which are thought to be weathering out of the outcrop.

The rock has been interpreted as a cemented fluvial sediment, deposited by a "vigorously" flowing stream, probably between ankle and waist deep. This stream is part of an ancient alluvial fan, which descends from the steep terrain at the rim of Gale crater across its floor.

See also

 Aeolis quadrangle 
 Bedrock
 Composition of Mars 
 Geology of Mars 
 Goulburn (Mars)
 Hottah (Mars) 
 List of rocks on Mars
 Rock outcrop
 Timeline of Mars Science Laboratory
 Water on Mars

References

External links 
Curiosity rover - Official Site
NASA - Mars Exploration Program 
Volcanic rock classification 
Video (04:32) - Evidence: Water "Vigorously" Flowed On Mars - September, 2012

Surface features of Mars
Aeolis quadrangle
Mars Science Laboratory
Rocks on Mars